The James C. Tappan House, also known as the Tappan-Pillow House, is a historic house at 717 Poplar Street in Helena, Arkansas. It is a two-story wood-frame structure, three bays wide, with a hip roof. A two-story porch projects from the main facade, topped by a Greek Revival triangular pediment with brackets. The porch is supported by square columns and has urn-shaped balusters.

History 

The house was built in 1858 for James C. Tappan, and is unusual for the extremely early appearance of otherwise later Victorian features in its design. Tappan served as a senior officer in the Confederate States Army during the Civil War; his house was occupied by higher-ranking United States Army officers during the occupation of Helena. The house was listed on the National Register of Historic Places on June 4, 1973.

See also
National Register of Historic Places listings in Phillips County, Arkansas

References

Houses on the National Register of Historic Places in Arkansas
Greek Revival houses in Arkansas
Houses completed in 1858
Houses in Phillips County, Arkansas
National Register of Historic Places in Phillips County, Arkansas
Historic district contributing properties in Arkansas